The Ellen E. Ward Memorial Clock Tower (also known as the Roslyn Clock Tower) is a historic clock tower in Roslyn, New York. It is considered to be the symbol of Roslyn and appears on that village's official seal.

History 
The clock tower was constructed in 1895 as a memorial to Ellen E. Ward (1826–1893), who was a prominent and active Roslyn resident best known for donating the historic horse trough within the village. The tower was commissioned by Ward's children. The tower was designed by the firm of Lamb & Rich.

The clock tower was rehabilitated in the 1990s and 2000s, and for its centennial in 1995, the Town of North Hempstead sold the tower to the Village of Roslyn for $1. The rehabilitation efforts experienced delays in the 2000s due to various reasons, including trouble securing grant money from New York following the September 11, 2001 terrorist attacks. The rehabilitation efforts were finally completed after 11 years in 2006.

Specifications 

 Exterior materials: granite & sandstone
 Clockworks manufacturer: Seth Thomas & Co.
 Clock type: weight-driven
 Bell weight: approximately

See also 

 Main Street Historic District (Roslyn, New York)

References 

Roslyn, New York
Clock towers in New York (state)
Historic district contributing properties in New York (state)